Kristina Louise Yothers  is an American actress and singer. Beginning a career as a child actor at the age of three, she is best known for her role as Jennifer Keaton on the hit NBC series Family Ties, as well as for her roles in numerous television films throughout the 1980s and early 1990s including The Cherokee Trail, Crash Course, and Spunk: The Tonya Harding Story among others.

Early life
Yothers was born in Whittier, California. Her father, Robert Yothers, was a television producer. She has three brothers, Jeffrey and Randy (twins), and Cory, who all acted in commercials as children. Randy, as a child actor, made several TV appearances in the early 1970s, and a film appearance in Return From Witch Mountain (1978), all credited as "Poindexter" Yothers. Cory appeared in numerous films and television shows throughout the early 1980s, often credited as "Bumper" Yothers.

Career
Yothers began her acting career in television advertisements at age three. Her first cinema role was in the 1981 television film The Cherokee Trail. She also appeared in the 1982 feature film Shoot the Moon. Her most famous role was that of Jennifer Keaton, the younger daughter in the television comedy Family Ties that aired from 1982 to 1989. She also competed in the Battle of the Network Stars in December 1988. When Family Ties ended, Yothers abandoned her blonde hair color and has mostly worn it black since, with the notable exception of a 1996 appearance on the Married... with Children sitcom.

Yothers wrote the book Being Your Best: Tina Yothers's Guide for Girls and formed the band Jaded with her brother Cory. She provided the lead vocals while Cory played keyboard. In 1998, Jaded released their self-titled CD, which was co-written by Cory Yothers, Michael Anderson, Tina Yothers and performed by Tina Yothers (lead vocals), Michael Anderson (guitars/vocals), Jerry France (guitars/vocals), Larry Rosales (drums), Mike Wilson (bass) and Phil Jordan from No Doubt on trumpet, along with a DJ. Previously, Yothers sang a cover of The Raes song "Baby I'm Back in Love Again", which she later recorded as a single, in the "Band on the Run" episode of Family Ties that aired February 26, 1987.

After a nine-year absence from acting, Yothers was given the lead role in Lovelace the Musical, a 2004 stage show based on the life of former pornographic film star Linda Lovelace. She followed that up with a stint as a stock player in the Burt Reynolds Dinner Theater in Boca Raton, Florida from 2005 to 2007.

She also appeared as herself on a special TV child stars edition of The Weakest Link in 2001 where she was voted off in round 5.

Yothers appeared on the fourth season of the VH1 reality television show Celebrity Fit Club, which began on August 6, 2006. After Yothers's second pregnancy, she appeared on Celebrity Fit Club: Boot Camp to try get back to her post-Fit Club weight. On January 17, 2012, she was featured on the ABC show Celebrity Wife Swap, where she traded places with Niecy Nash of Reno 911!.

In February 2013, Yothers appeared on an episode of the TLC series What Not To Wear.

Filmography

Film and television

Awards and nominations

References

External links 

 
 

Living people
Actresses from California
American child actresses
American self-help writers
American television actresses
American film actresses
American stage actresses
20th-century American actresses
Musicians from Whittier, California
Participants in American reality television series
Actors from Whittier, California
Writers from Whittier, California
Singers from California
21st-century American singers
21st-century American women singers
Year of birth missing (living people)